Ryan Hunter (born 19 November 1992) is an Irish cricketer. He made his Twenty20 debut for North West Warriors in the 2020 Inter-Provincial Trophy on 1 September 2020. Prior to his Twenty20 debut, he was part of Ireland's squad for the 2012 Under-19 Cricket World Cup.

References

External links
 

1992 births
Living people
Irish cricketers
North West Warriors cricketers
Place of birth missing (living people)